Susan Black may refer to:

 Susan Easton Black (born 1944), American historian
 Sue Black, Baroness Black of Strome (Susan Margaret Black, born 1961), Scottish forensic anthropologist
 Sue Black (computer scientist) (Susan Elizabeth Black, born 1962), British computer scientist, academic and social entrepreneur
 Susan H. Black (born 1943), American judge
 Susan Black (1936–2020), British film actress known as Susan Beaumont

See also
 Sue Black (disambiguation)